"Wasting Time" is a song by American R&B singer Brent Faiyaz featuring Canadian rapper Drake and production duo The Neptunes, the latter of whom also produced the song. It was released on July 1, 2021.

Background
On June 30, 2021, the song leaked and it was made available on Apple Music in New Zealand. It was released the next day. The cover art of the single pays tribute to Pharrell Williams' album In My Mind.

Composition
The song features "lush synth pads and booming 808s", and finds the artists asking their respective lovers for more quality time with them. In the chorus, Faiyaz sings, "If you're gonna waste your time / Then waste your time with me / You can have all the space / More than you need / It's no pressure, girl / If you got time to waste / Waste it with me". Drake's verse is about his frustrations and distrust towards past lovers; he raps about how they "stay calculatin' moves, like Beth Harmon" and calls himself a "pessimist gold medalist". He also swears to be more "'Purple Rain' Prince than Prince Charmin'" and name-drops Aaliyah ("Only time I play the back and forth is Aaliyah record").

Critical reception
Jordan Darville of The Fader wrote that the song "aims for a woozy and timeless atmosphere, boosted by soaring orchestral strings and a crackling chemistry between Faiyaz's vocals and Drake's bars." Jordan Rose of Complex noted the song sharing a common theme with Brent Faiyaz's song "Gravity", in that he "croons about respecting his lover's space, but still being willing to share his world with her".

Charts

Certifications

References

2021 singles
2021 songs
Brent Faiyaz songs
Drake (musician) songs
Song recordings produced by the Neptunes
Songs written by Drake (musician)
Songs written by Pharrell Williams
Songs written by Chad Hugo